Wakenva is an unincorporated community in Dickenson County, Virginia, in the United States.

History
A post office was established at Wakenva in 1926, and remained in operation until it was discontinued in 1957. The name of the community is a portmanteau of West Virginia, Kentucky, and Virginia.

References

Unincorporated communities in Dickenson County, Virginia
Unincorporated communities in Virginia